Vladimír Weiss (born 22 September 1964) is a Slovak football manager and former player. He currently serves as the manager of Slovan Bratislava, in his second spell with the club.  He was the manager of the Georgian national team from 2016 to 2020, also managing Slovakia between 2008 and 2012.

Playing career
Weiss played internationally for the national teams of Czechoslovakia and later Slovakia. He played at club level for Inter Bratislava.

International career
Weiss played in the 1990 World Cup for Czechoslovakia. He has 19 caps for Czechoslovakia and also 12 caps for Slovakia.

Coaching career
As the coach of Artmedia Bratislava Weiss won the Slovak Corgoň Liga and reached the group stage in the 2005–06 season of UEFA Champions League. He coached FC Saturn Moscow Oblast from February 2006 to June 2007. He brought several Slovak footballers from his former club. In June 2007 he returned to FC Artmedia Bratislava like an "old-new coach".

In 2008, he became the head coach of the Slovakia national team. On 14 October 2009, he led the team to the historic success of Slovakia's first-ever qualification for a major tournament, with Slovakia winning the qualifying group thanks to beating Poland 1–0 in an away match in the final qualifying game. On 24 June 2010, he led his Slovakia side to the World Cup last 16 after a 3–2 win over Italy. In late January 2012, he parted ways with Slovakia on his own accord following the team's failure to qualify for the Euro 2012 tournament. Weiss then worked in Kazakhstan, in the football club of Almaty, FC Kairat, which is very famous throughout the CIS. He left Kairat at the end of November 2015. Weiss took over as manager of the Georgia national team in March 2016 and resigned in November 2020.

Personal life
His son, also named Vladimír Weiss, plays for Slovan Bratislava, having also appeared in Premier League, La Liga and Serie A. His father, also named Vladimír Weiss, was a footballer who represented Czechoslovakia and is a silver Olympic medalist from 1964 Summer Olympics.

As a young man in socialist Czechoslovakia, Weiss completed his compulsory military service in Komárno.

Honours
Artmedia
Corgoň Liga (2): 2004–05, 2007–08
Slovak Cup (1): 2008
UEFA Champions League: Group stage 2005–06
Uefa Cup: Final Phase 2005–06

Slovan
Slovak Super Liga (2): 2020–21, 2021–22
UEFA Europa League: Group stage 2011–12

Kairat
Kazakhstan Cup (2): 2014, 2015
Kazakhstan Premier League: Runners-up: 2015

Slovakia
2010 FIFA World Cup: Round of 16

Managerial statistics

References

External links
 
  

1964 births
Footballers from Bratislava
Slovak footballers
Czechoslovak footballers
Slovak football managers
Slovakia national football team managers
2010 FIFA World Cup managers
Living people
1990 FIFA World Cup players
Slovakia international footballers
Czechoslovakia international footballers
AC Sparta Prague players
FK Inter Bratislava players
FC VSS Košice players
FC Petržalka players
Slovak Super Liga players
FC Saturn Ramenskoye managers
Russian Premier League managers
Dual internationalists (football)
ŠK Slovan Bratislava managers
Slovak Super Liga managers
Expatriate football managers in Russia
FK Drnovice players
FC Petržalka managers
FC Kairat managers
Expatriate football managers in Kazakhstan
Expatriate football managers in Georgia (country)
Georgia national football team managers
Slovak expatriate football managers
Slovak expatriate sportspeople in Russia
Slovak expatriate sportspeople in Kazakhstan
Slovak expatriate sportspeople in Georgia (country)
Association football midfielders
Vladimir